This is a list of films which have placed number one at the box office in New Zealand during 2020.

Highest-grossing films

References

See also
List of New Zealand films – New Zealand films by year
2020 in film

2020
New Zealand